The Aurland Power Station is a hydroelectric power station located in the municipality Aurland in Vestland, Norway, owned by E-CO Energi. The construction works were initiated in 1969, and the first production from Aurland I started in 1973.

See also

References 

Hydroelectric power stations in Norway
Buildings and structures in Vestland
Aurland